The SPL Itä-Suomen piiri (Eastern Finland Football Association) is one of the 12 district organisations of the Football Association of Finland. It administers lower tier football in Eastern Finland.

Background 

Suomen Palloliitto Itä-Suomen piiri, commonly referred to as SPL Itä-Suomen piiri or SPL Itä-Suomi, is the governing body for football in Eastern Finland. Based in Kuopio, the Association's Director is Pekka Ojala. The organisation was established in 1994 following the amalgamation of SPL Joensuun piiri and SPL Savon piiri.

Member clubs

League Competitions 
SPL Itä-Suomen piiri run the following league competitions:

Men's Football
 Division 3 - Kolmonen  -  one section
 Division 4 - Nelonen  -  two sections
 Division 5 - Vitonen  -  three sections

Ladies Football
 Division 3 - Kolmonen  -  one section
 Small-sided - Pienkenttä  -  one section

Footnotes

References

External links 
 SPL Itä-Suomen piiri Official Website 

I
Sports organizations established in 1994